John "Jack" Swanstrom (1961/2 – March 4, 2015) was an American educator and
film director. He has a Master of Fine Arts in directing from the AFI Conservatory and a Master of Arts in Theatre from Humboldt State University.

During the Gulf War, he served with Team 45, Detachment 1 of the 354th Civil Affairs Brigade. He was awarded the Army Commendation Medal for service during Operation Desert Shield and the Bronze Star Medal for Operation Desert Storm.

Swanstrom was an assistant professor of film and design in the College of Architecture, Art and Design (CAAD) in the American University of Sharjah from 2002 until his death in 2015.

His films have screened at over 130 film festivals worldwide, including the 60th, 64th, 65th, and 66th annual Cannes Film Festival.

Filmography

Directing
1993: Saint Crispin's Day
1995: Lead the Way (ranger!)
1997: The Way to Santiago
2006: A.W.O.L.
2010: The Ranger from Kelly Street 
2012: Bu Qtair
2013: Four Days

Producing
1993: Saint Crispin's Day (producer)
1995: Lead the Way (ranger!) (producer)
1998: A Short Wait Between Trains  (associate producer)
2006: A.W.O.L. (executive producer) 
2010 The Ranger from Kelly Street (producer)
2011: Meanwhile  (co-producer)
2011: No Wine Left Behind (associate producer) 
2012: Martin Hill: Cameraman (executive producer)
2012: Bu Qtair (producer)
2013: Four Days (producer)
2013: Tatanka (co-producer)

Death
John Swanstrom died on March 4, 2015, at his home.

References

External links

1960s births
2015 deaths
American film directors
California State Polytechnic University, Humboldt alumni
AFI Conservatory alumni
United States Army personnel of the Gulf War
Academic staff of the American University of Sharjah